The 2003 New York Yankees season was the 101st season for the team. The team finished with a record of 101-61 finishing 6 games ahead of the Boston Red Sox. New York was managed by Joe Torre. The Yankees played at Yankee Stadium. In the playoffs, they defeated the Red Sox in 7 games in the ALCS, winning the pennant on Aaron Boone's dramatic 11th-inning home run. The Yankees advanced to the World Series, losing in a dramatic 6 game series to the Florida Marlins. It would be their second World Series loss in three years and last appearance in a World Series until 2009.

Offseason
December 6, 2002: Robin Ventura was re-signed as a free agent with the New York Yankees.
December 19, 2002: Hideki Matsui was signed as a free agent with the New York Yankees.
December 19, 2002: Todd Zeile was signed as a free agent with the New York Yankees.
January 3, 2003: Brandon Knight was released by the New York Yankees.

Regular season
On June 11, 2003, six Astros pitchers combined to throw a no-hitter against the New York Yankees. The six pitchers were Roy Oswalt, Pete Munro, Kirk Saarloos, Brad Lidge, Octavio Dotel and Billy Wagner. It was the first no-hitter against the Yankees in 45 years.

Opening Day starters

1B – Jason Giambi
2B – Alfonso Soriano
SS – Derek Jeter
3B – Robin Ventura
C  – Jorge Posada
LF – Hideki Matsui
CF – Bernie Williams
RF – Raúl Mondesí
DH – Nick Johnson
P  – Roger Clemens

Season standings

Record vs. opponents

Notable transactions
 May 23, 2003: Curtis Pride was purchased by the New York Yankees from the Nashua Pride (Atlantic League).
 July 22, 2003: Jesse Orosco was sent to the New York Yankees by the San Diego Padres as part of a conditional deal.
 July 29, 2003: Raúl Mondesí was traded by the New York Yankees with cash to the Arizona Diamondbacks for David Dellucci, Bret Prinz, and John Prowl (minors).
 July 31, 2003: Robin Ventura was traded by the New York Yankees to the Los Angeles Dodgers for Bubba Crosby and Scott Proctor.
 August 18, 2003: Todd Zeile was released by the New York Yankees.
 August 31, 2003: Jesse Orosco was traded by the New York Yankees to the Minnesota Twins for a player to be named later. The Minnesota Twins sent Juan Padilla (September 2, 2003) to the New York Yankees to complete the trade.

Roster

Game log 

|- bgcolor="bbffbb"
| 1 || March 31 || @ Blue Jays || 8–4 || Clemens (1–0) || Halladay (0–1) || — || SkyDome || 50,119 || 1–0

|- bgcolor="bbffbb"
| 2 || April 1 || @ Blue Jays || 10–1 || Pettitte (1–0) || Lidle (0–1) || — || SkyDome || 15,176 || 2–0
|- bgcolor="bbffbb"
| 3 || April 2 || @ Blue Jays || 9–7 || Mussina (1–0) || Hendrickson (0–1) || Acevedo (1) || SkyDome || 16,222 || 3–0
|- bgcolor="bbffbb"
| 4 || April 4 || @ Devil Rays || 12–2 || Wells (1–0) || Parris (0–1) || — || Tropicana Field || 15,169 || 4–0
|- bgcolor="ffbbbb"
| 5 || April 5 || @ Devil Rays || 5–6 || Carter (1–0) || Osuna (0–1) || — || Tropicana Field || 20,096 || 4–1
|- bgcolor="bbffbb"
| 6 || April 6 || @ Devil Rays || 10–5 || Clemens (2–0) || Zambrano (0–1) || — || Tropicana Field || 18,363 || 5–1
|- bgcolor="bbbbbb"
| – || April 7 || Twins || colspan=8|Postponed (snow) Rescheduled for April 8
|- bgcolor="bbffbb"
| 7 || April 8 || Twins || 7–3 || Pettitte (2–0) || Mays (1–1) || — || Yankee Stadium || 33,109 || 6–1
|- bgcolor="bbffbb"
| 8 || April 9 || Twins || 2–1 || Mussina (2–0) || Lohse (1–1) || Acevedo (2) || Yankee Stadium || 31,898 || 7–1
|- bgcolor="bbffbb"
| 9 || April 10 || Twins || 2–0 || Wells (2–0) || Reed (0–2) || — || Yankee Stadium || 29,255 || 8–1
|- bgcolor="bbbbbb"
| – || April 11 || Devil Rays || colspan=8|Postponed (rain) Rescheduled for June 17
|- bgcolor="bbffbb"
| 10 || April 12 || Devil Rays || 5–4 || Osuna (1–1) || Harper (0–1) || — || Yankee Stadium || 35,326 || 9–1
|- bgcolor="ffbbbb"
| 11 || April 13 || Devil Rays || 1–2 || Carter (3–0) || Acevedo (0-1) || — || Yankee Stadium || 39,725 || 9–2
|- bgcolor="bbffbb"
| 12 || April 14 || Blue Jays || 10–9 || Contreras (1–0) || Lopez (0–1) || Hammond (1) || Yankee Stadium || 30,761 || 10–2
|- bgcolor="bbffbb"
| 13 || April 15 || Blue Jays || 5–0 || Mussina (3–0) || Halladay (0–2) || — || Yankee Stadium || 33,833 || 11–2
|- bgcolor="ffbbbb"
| 14 || April 16 || Blue Jays || 6–7 || Lidle (2–2) || Hitchcock (0–1) || Escobar (2) || Yankee Stadium || 25,831 || 11–3
|- bgcolor="bbffbb"
| 15 || April 17 || Blue Jays || 4–0 || Weaver (1–0) || Walker (1–1) || — || Yankee Stadium || 32,057 || 12–3
|- bgcolor="bbffbb"
| 16 || April 18 || @ Twins || 11–4 || Clemens (3–0) || Radke (1–2) || — || Hubert H. Humphrey Metrodome || 37,843 || 13–3
|- bgcolor="bbffbb"
| 17 || April 19 || @ Twins || 4–2 || Pettitte (3–0) || Mays (2–2) || Acevedo (3) || Hubert H. Humphrey Metrodome || 36,139 || 14–3
|- bgcolor="bbffbb"
| 18 || April 20 || @ Twins || 8–2 || Mussina (4–0) || Lohse (2–2) || — || Hubert H. Humphrey Metrodome || 18,818 || 15–3
|- bgcolor="bbffbb"
| 19 || April 21 || @ Twins || 15–1 || Wells (3–0) || Reed (1–3) || — || Hubert H. Humphrey Metrodome || 20,845 || 16–3
|- bgcolor="bbffbb"
| 20 || April 22 || @ Angels || 8–3 || Weaver (2–0) || Lackey (1–2) || — || Edison International Field of Anaheim || 38,343 || 17–3
|- bgcolor="bbffbb"
| 21 || April 23 || @ Angels || 9–2 || Clemens (4–0) || Callaway (1–2) || — || Edison International Field of Anaheim || 38,340 || 18–3
|- bgcolor="ffbbbb"
| 22 || April 24 || @ Angels || 2–6 || Ortiz (3–2) || Pettitte (3–1) || — || Edison International Field of Anaheim || 39,169 || 18–4
|- bgcolor="bbffbb"
| 23 || April 25 || @ Rangers || 3–2 || Mussina (5–0) || Lewis (3–1) || Acevedo (4) || The Ballpark in Arlington || 40,052 || 19–4
|- bgcolor="bbffbb"
| 24 || April 26 || @ Rangers || 7–5  || Hammond (1–0) || Urbina (0–1) || Acevedo (5) || The Ballpark in Arlington || 48,247 || 20–4
|- bgcolor="ffbbbb"
| 25 || April 27 || @ Rangers || 7–10 || Dickey (2–1) || Weaver (2–1) || Urbina (8) || The Ballpark in Arlington || 49,544 || 20–5
|- bgcolor="ffbbbb"
| 26 || April 29 || Mariners || 0–6 || Meche (3–1) || Clemens (4–1) || — || Yankee Stadium || 38,724 || 20–6
|- bgcolor="bbffbb"
| 27 || April 30 || Mariners || 8–5 || Pettitte (4–1) || Moyer (3–2) || — || Yankee Stadium || 30,522 || 21–6

|- bgcolor="bbffbb"
| 28 || May 1 || Mariners || 2–1 || Mussina (6–0) || Pineiro (2–2) || Rivera (1) || Yankee Stadium || 34,991 || 22–6
|- bgcolor="bbffbb"
| 29 || May 2 || Athletics || 5–3 || Wells (4–0) || Lilly (2–1) || Rivera (2) || Yankee Stadium || 38,538 || 23–6
|- bgcolor="ffbbbb"
| 30 || May 3 || Athletics || 3–5  || Foulke (1–0) || Acevedo (0-2) || — || Yankee Stadium || 44,176 || 23–7
|- bgcolor="ffbbbb"
| 31 || May 4 || Athletics || 0–2 || Zito (5–2) || Clemens (4–2) || Foulke (8) || Yankee Stadium || 45,426 || 23–8
|- bgcolor="ffbbbb"
| 32 || May 6 || @ Mariners || 7–12 || Moyer (4–2) || Pettitte (4–2) || — || Safeco Field || 44,979 || 23–9
|- bgcolor="bbffbb"
| 33 || May 7 || @ Mariners || 7–2 || Mussina (7–0) || Pineiro (2–3) || — || Safeco Field || 43,753 || 24–9
|- bgcolor="bbffbb"
| 34 || May 8 || @ Mariners || 16–5 || Wells (5–0) || Garcia (3–4) || — || Safeco Field || 46,000 || 25–9
|- bgcolor="ffbbbb"
| 35 || May 9 || @ Athletics || 2–7 || Hudson (3–1) || Weaver (2–2) || — || Network Associates Coliseum || 40,317 || 25–10
|- bgcolor="bbffbb"
| 36 || May 10 || @ Athletics || 5–2 || Clemens (5–2) || Zito (5–3) || Rivera (3) || Network Associates Coliseum || 44,486 || 26–10
|- bgcolor="ffbbbb"
| 37 || May 11 || @ Athletics || 2–5 || Mulder (6–1) || Pettitte (4–3) || Foulke (10) || Network Associates Coliseum || 45,390 || 26–11
|- bgcolor="ffbbbb"
| 38 || May 13 || Angels || 3–10 || Lackey (2–3) || Mussina (7–1) || — || Yankee Stadium || 37,750 || 26–12
|- bgcolor="ffbbbb"
| 39 || May 14 || Angels || 3–5 || Rodriguez (3–1) || Wells (5–1) || Percival (5) || Yankee Stadium || 33,647 || 26–13
|- bgcolor="bbffbb"
| 40 || May 15 || Angels || 10–4 || Weaver (3–2) || Sele (1–1) || — || Yankee Stadium || 29,670 || 27–13
|- bgcolor="ffbbbb"
| 41 || May 16 || Rangers || 5–8  || Dickey (3–1) || Acevedo (0-3) || Urbina (11) || Yankee Stadium || 40,055 || 27–14
|- bgcolor="ffbbbb"
| 42 || May 17 || Rangers || 2–5 || Valdez (3–2) || Pettitte (4–4) || Urbina (12) || Yankee Stadium || 51,095 || 27–15
|- bgcolor="ffbbbb"
| 43 || May 18 || Rangers || 1–5 || Thomson (3–4) || Mussina (7–2) || — || Yankee Stadium || 54,942 || 27–16
|- bgcolor="bbffbb"
| 44 || May 19 || @ Red Sox || 7–3 || Wells (6–1) || Fossum (4–2) || — || Fenway Park || 35,099 || 28–16
|- bgcolor="ffbbbb"
| 45 || May 20 || @ Red Sox || 7–10 || Embree (3–1) || Contreras (1–1) || Lyon (6) || Fenway Park || 35,007 || 28–17
|- bgcolor="bbffbb"
| 46 || May 21 || @ Red Sox || 4–2 || Clemens (6–2) || Wakefield (4–2) || Rivera (4) || Fenway Park || 35,003 || 29–17
|- bgcolor="ffbbbb"
| 47 || May 22 || Blue Jays || 3–8 || Halladay (5–2) || Pettitte (4–5) || — || Yankee Stadium || 45,777 || 29–18
|- bgcolor="ffbbbb"
| 48 || May 23 || Blue Jays || 2–6 || Escobar (2–1) || Mussina (7–3) || — || Yankee Stadium || 34,134 || 29–19
|- bgcolor="ffbbbb"
| 49 || May 24 || Blue Jays || 2–5 || Lidle (8–2) || Wells (6–2) || Politte (7) || Yankee Stadium || 35,023 || 29–20
|- bgcolor="ffbbbb"
| 50 || May 25 || Blue Jays || 3–5 || Davis (2–3) || Weaver (3–3) || Politte (8) || Yankee Stadium || 40,940 || 29–21
|- bgcolor="ffbbbb"
| 51 || May 26 || Red Sox || 4–8 || Wakefield (5–2) || Clemens (6–3) || — || Yankee Stadium || 55,093 || 29–22
|- bgcolor="bbffbb"
| 52 || May 27 || Red Sox || 11–3 || Pettitte (5–5) || Chen (0–1) || — || Yankee Stadium || 44,769 || 30–22
|- bgcolor="bbffbb"
| 53 || May 28 || Red Sox || 6–5 || Rivera (1–0) || Lyon (1–2) || — || Yankee Stadium || 44,617 || 31–22
|- bgcolor="bbffbb"
| 54 || May 30 || @ Tigers || 6–0 || Contreras (2–1) || Knotts (2–4) || — || Comerica Park || 28,003 || 32–22
|- bgcolor="ffbbbb"
| 55 || May 31 || @ Tigers || 2–4 || Bernero (1–6) || Weaver (3–4) || German (3) || Comerica Park || 24,959 || 32–23

|- bgcolor="bbffbb"
| 56 || June 1 || @ Tigers || 10–9  || Wells (7–2) || Sparks (0–2) || Acevedo (6) || Comerica Park || 44,095 || 33–23
|- bgcolor="ffbbbb"
| 57 || June 3 || @ Reds || 3–4 || Reitsma (4–2) || Osuna (1–2) || — || Great American Ball Park || 41,827 || 33–24
|- bgcolor="ffbbbb"
| 58 || June 4 || @ Reds || 2–6 || Wilson (3–4) || Mussina (7–4) || — || Great American Ball Park || 42,082 || 33–25
|- bgcolor="bbffbb"
| 59 || June 5 || @ Reds || 10–2 || Contreras (3–1) || Graves (3–5) || — || Great American Ball Park || 42,282 || 34–25
|- bgcolor="bbffbb"
| 60 || June 6 || @ Cubs || 5–3 || Wells (8–2) || Zambrano (5–5) || Rivera (5) || Wrigley Field || 39,359 || 35–25
|- bgcolor="ffbbbb"
| 61 || June 7 || @ Cubs || 2–5 || Wood (5–4) || Clemens (6–4) || — || Wrigley Field || 39,363 || 35–26
|- bgcolor="ffbbbb"
| 62 || June 8 || @ Cubs || 7–8 || Prior (7–2) || Pettitte (5–6) || Borowski (11) || Wrigley Field || 39,341 || 35–27
|- bgcolor="bbffbb"
| 63 || June 10 || Astros || 5–3 || Mussina (8–4) || Miller (4–7) || Rivera (6) || Yankee Stadium || 37,602 || 36–27
|- bgcolor="ffbbbb"
| 64 || June 11 || Astros || 0–8 || Lidge (4–0) || Weaver (3–5) || — || Yankee Stadium || 29,905 || 36–28
|- bgcolor="bbffbb"
| 65 || June 12 || Astros || 6–5 || Osuna (2–2) || Dotel (5–2) || Rivera (7) || Yankee Stadium || 39,888 || 37–28
|- bgcolor="bbffbb"
| 66 || June 13 || Cardinals || 5–2 || Clemens (7–4) || Simontacchi (4–4) || Rivera (8) || Yankee Stadium || 55,214 || 38–28
|- bgcolor="bbffbb"
| 67 || June 14 || Cardinals || 13–4 || Pettitte (6–6) || Morris (7–4) || — || Yankee Stadium || 55,174 || 39–28
|- bgcolor="bbffbb"
| 68 || June 15 || Cardinals || 5–2 || Mussina (9–4) || Williams (8–2) || Rivera (9) || Yankee Stadium || 54,797 || 40–28
|- bgcolor="ffbbbb"
| 69 || June 17  || Devil Rays || 2–11 || Gonzalez (3–2) || Weaver (3–6) || — || Yankee Stadium || 14,077 || 40–29
|- bgcolor="bbffbb"
| 70 || June 17  || Devil Rays || 10–2 || Wells (9–2) || Brazelton (1–6) || — || Yankee Stadium || 47,604 || 41–29
|- bgcolor="bbffbb"
| 71 || June 18 || Devil Rays || 1–0  || Hammond (2–0) || Carter (4–2) || — || Yankee Stadium || 32,643 || 42–29
|- bgcolor="bbbbbb"
| – || June 19 || Devil Rays || colspan=8|Postponed (rain) Rescheduled for September 13
|- bgcolor="bbffbb"
| 72 || June 20 || @ Mets || 5–0 || Pettitte (7–6) || Trachsel (5–5) || — || Shea Stadium || 55,386 || 43–29
|- bgcolor="bbbbbb"
| – || June 21 || @ Mets || colspan=8|Postponed (rain) Rescheduled for June 28
|- bgcolor="bbffbb"
| 73 || June 22 || @ Mets || 7–3  || Rivera (2–0) || Lloyd (1–2) || — || Shea Stadium || 55,031 || 44–29
|- bgcolor="ffbbbb"
| 74 || June 23 || @ Devil Rays || 2–4 || Zambrano (4–4) || Clemens (7–5) || Carter (12) || Tropicana Field || 14,759 || 44–30
|- bgcolor="bbffbb"
| 75 || June 24 || @ Devil Rays || 10–9 || Anderson (1–0) || Carter (4–3) || Rivera (10) || Tropicana Field || 16,300 || 45–30
|- bgcolor="bbffbb"
| 76 || June 25 || @ Devil Rays || 8–5 || Pettitte (8–6) || Bell (0–2) || Rivera (11) || Tropicana Field || 16,710 || 46–30
|- bgcolor="bbffbb"
| 77 || June 26 || @ Devil Rays || 4–3 || Mussina (10–4) || Standridge (0–3) || Rivera (12) || Tropicana Field || 17,132 || 47–30
|- bgcolor="bbffbb"
| 78 || June 27 || Mets || 6–4 || Wells (10–2) || Seo (5–3) || Miceli (1) || Yankee Stadium || 55,226 || 48–30
|- bgcolor="bbffbb"
| 79 || June 28  || Mets || 7–1 || Clemens (8–5) || Griffiths (0–1) || — || Yankee Stadium || 55,343 || 49–30
|- bgcolor="bbffbb"
| 80 || June 28  || @ Mets || 9–8 || Claussen (1–0) || Glavine (5–8) || Rivera (13) || Shea Stadium || 36,372 || 50–30
|- bgcolor="bbffbb"
| 81 || June 29 || Mets || 5–3 || Weaver (4–6) || Leiter (8–5) || Rivera (14) || Yankee Stadium || 55,444 || 51–30
|- bgcolor="bbffbb"
| 82 || June 30 || @ Orioles || 6–5 || Pettitte (9–6) || Ponson (10–5) || Rivera (15) || Oriole Park at Camden Yards || 38,618 || 52–30

|- bgcolor="ffbbbb"
| 83 || July 1 || @ Orioles || 3–7 || Lopez (2–4) || Mussina (10–5) || — || Oriole Park at Camden Yards || 36,023 || 52–31
|- bgcolor="bbbbbb"
| – || July 2 || @ Orioles || colspan=8|Postponed (rain) Rescheduled for August 14
|- bgcolor="ffbbbb"
| 84 || July 4 || Red Sox || 3–10 || Lowe (10–3) || Wells (10–3) || — || Yankee Stadium || 55,144 || 52–32
|- bgcolor="ffbbbb"
| 85 || July 5 || Red Sox || 2–10 || Mendoza (2–3) || Clemens (8–6) || — || Yankee Stadium || 54,948 || 52–33
|- bgcolor="bbffbb"
| 86 || July 6 || Red Sox || 7–1 || Pettitte (10–6) || Burkett (6–4) || — || Yankee Stadium || 54,918 || 53–33
|- bgcolor="bbffbb"
| 87 || July 7 || Red Sox || 2–1 || Rivera (3–0) || Kim (3–7) || — || Yankee Stadium || 55,016 || 54–33
|- bgcolor="ffbbbb"
| 88 || July 8 || @ Indians || 0–4 || Traber (4–5) || Weaver (4–7) || — || Jacobs Field || 26,540 || 54–34
|- bgcolor="bbffbb"
| 89 || July 9 || @ Indians || 6–2 || Wells (11–3) || Sabathia (8–4) || — || Jacobs Field || 25,058 || 55–34
|- bgcolor="ffbbbb"
| 90 || July 10 || @ Indians || 2–3  || Boyd (2–1) || Hitchcock (0–2) || — || Jacobs Field || 30,167 || 55–35
|- bgcolor="bbffbb"
| 91 || July 11 || @ Blue Jays || 8–5 || Pettitte (11–6) || Miller (1–1) || Rivera (16) || SkyDome || 27,652 || 56–35
|- bgcolor="ffbbbb"
| 92 || July 12 || @ Blue Jays || 3–10 || Halladay (13–2) || Mussina (10–6) || — || SkyDome || 37,119 || 56–36
|- bgcolor="bbffbb"
| 93 || July 13 || @ Blue Jays || 6–2 || Weaver (5–7) || Escobar (5–6) || — || SkyDome || 32,664 || 57–36
|- bgcolor="bbcaff" 
| colspan=10 | 74th All-Star Game in Chicago, Illinois
|- bgcolor="bbffbb"
| 94 || July 17 || Indians || 5–4 || Rivera (4–0) || Riske (2–2) || — || Yankee Stadium || 46,401 || 58–36
|- bgcolor="bbffbb"
| 95 || July 18 || Indians || 10–4 || Clemens (9–6) || Anderson (7–7) || — || Yankee Stadium || 47,341 || 59–36
|- bgcolor="bbffbb"
| 96 || July 19 || Indians || 7–4 || Wells (12–3) || Sabathia (8–5) || Rivera (17) || Yankee Stadium || 54,981 || 60–36
|- bgcolor="bbffbb"
| 97 || July 20 || Indians || 7–4 || Mussina (11–6) || Westbrook (4–5) || Rivera (18) || Yankee Stadium || 51,891 || 61–36
|- bgcolor="ffbbbb"
| 98 || July 21 || Blue Jays || 0–8  || Hendrickson (6–6) || Weaver (5–8) || — || Yankee Stadium || 51,958 || 61–37
|- bgcolor="bbbbbb"
| – || July 22 || Blue Jays || colspan=8|Postponed (rain) Rescheduled for September 8
|- bgcolor="bbffbb"
| 99 || July 23 || Orioles || 4–2 || Pettitte (12–6) || Helling (6–7) || Rivera (19) || Yankee Stadium || 39,331 || 62–37
|- bgcolor="ffbbbb"
| 100 || July 24 || Orioles || 3–5 || Ponson (14–5) || Clemens (9–7) || Julio (23) || Yankee Stadium || 44,649 || 62–38
|- bgcolor="bbffbb"
| 101 || July 25 || @ Red Sox || 4–3 || Rivera (5–0) || Kim (4–8) || — || Fenway Park || 34,873 || 63–38
|- bgcolor="ffbbbb"
| 102 || July 26 || @ Red Sox || 4–5 || Kim (5–8) || Benitez (3–4) || — || Fenway Park || 34,356 || 63–39
|- bgcolor="ffbbbb"
| 103 || July 27 || @ Red Sox || 4–6 || Fossum (5–4) || Hammond (2–1) || Kim (6) || Fenway Park || 34,787 || 63–40
|- bgcolor="bbffbb"
| 104 || July 29 || @ Angels || 6–2 || Pettitte (13–6) || Appier (7–7) || — || Edison International Field of Anaheim || 43,817 || 64–40
|- bgcolor="bbffbb"
| 105 || July 30 || @ Angels || 8–0 || Clemens (10–7) || Lackey (7–10) || — || Edison International Field of Anaheim || 43,856 || 65–40
|- bgcolor="bbffbb"
| 106 || July 31 || @ Angels || 2–1  || Benitez (4–4) || Percival (0–3) || Rivera (20) || Edison International Field of Anaheim || 43,871 || 66–40

|- bgcolor="ffbbbb"
| 107 || August 1 || @ Athletics || 2–3  || Foulke (8–1) || Osuna (2–3) || — || Network Associates Coliseum || 41,407 || 66–41
|- bgcolor="bbffbb"
| 108 || August 2 || @ Athletics || 10–7 || Weaver (6–8) || Zito (8–9) || Rivera (21) || Network Associates Coliseum || 44,234 || 67–41
|- bgcolor="ffbbbb"
| 109 || August 3 || @ Athletics || 1–2 || Mulder (15–7) || Rivera (5–1) || — || Network Associates Coliseum || 44,528 || 67–42
|- bgcolor="bbffbb"
| 110 || August 5 || Rangers || 6–2 || Clemens (11–7) || Lewis (4–7) || — || Yankee Stadium || 40,604 || 68–42
|- bgcolor="ffbbbb"
| 111 || August 6 || Rangers || 4–5 || Mahay (1–0) || Rivera (5–2) || Cordero (6) || Yankee Stadium || 47,344 || 68–43
|- bgcolor="bbffbb"
| 112 || August 7 || Rangers || 7–5 || Mussina (12–6) || Fultz (1–2) || Rivera (22) || Yankee Stadium || 51,763 || 69–43
|- bgcolor="bbffbb"
| 113 || August 8 || Mariners || 9–7 || Hitchcock (1–2) || Franklin (8–10) || Rivera (23) || Yankee Stadium || 52,793 || 70–43
|- bgcolor="ffbbbb"
| 114 || August 9 || Mariners || 1–2 || Meche (13–7) || Pettitte (13–7) || Hasegawa (9) || Yankee Stadium || 54,945 || 70–44
|- bgcolor="ffbbbb"
| 115 || August 10 || Mariners || 6–8 || Soriano (2–0) || Osuna (2–4) || Hasegawa (10) || Yankee Stadium || 54,828 || 70–45
|- bgcolor="ffbbbb"
| 116 || August 11 || @ Royals || 9–12 || D.J. Carrasco (4–4) || Hitchcock (1–3) || — || Kauffman Stadium || 40,406 || 70–46
|- bgcolor="bbffbb"
| 117 || August 12 || @ Royals || 6–0 || Mussina (13–6) || May (5–6) || — || Kauffman Stadium || 37,820 || 71–46
|- bgcolor="ffbbbb"
| 118 || August 13 || @ Royals || 0–11 || Appier (8–8) || Weaver (6–9) || — || Kauffman Stadium || 35,596 || 71–47
|- bgcolor="bbffbb"
| 119 || August 14 || @ Orioles || 8–5 || Pettitte (14–7) || DuBose (1–2) || Rivera (24) || Oriole Park at Camden Yards || 41,987 || 72–47
|- bgcolor="bbffbb"
| 120 || August 15 || @ Orioles || 6–4 || Nelson (4–2) || Julio (0–5) || Rivera (25) || Oriole Park at Camden Yards || 47,850 || 73–47
|- bgcolor="bbffbb"
| 121 || August 16 || @ Orioles || 5–4  || Hammond (3–1) || H. Carrasco (1–4) || Nelson (8) || Oriole Park at Camden Yards || 48,499 || 74–47
|- bgcolor="bbffbb"
| 122 || August 17 || @ Orioles || 8–0 || Mussina (14–6) || Lopez (5–8) || — || Oriole Park at Camden Yards || 48,700 || 75–47
|- bgcolor="bbffbb"
| 123 || August 18 || Royals || 11–6 || Weaver (7–9) || Lima (7–1) || — || Yankee Stadium || 48,937 || 76–47
|- bgcolor="bbffbb"
| 124 || August 19 || Royals || 6–3 || Pettitte (15–7) || Appier (8–9) || Rivera (26) || Yankee Stadium || 43,841 || 77–47
|- bgcolor="bbffbb"
| 125 || August 20 || Royals || 8–7 || Clemens (12–7) || Gobble (2–2) || Rivera (27) || Yankee Stadium || 46,973 || 78–47
|- bgcolor="ffbbbb"
| 126 || August 22 || Orioles || 3–4 || Hentgen (5–6) || Wells (12–4) || Groom (1) || Yankee Stadium || 44,121 || 78–48
|- bgcolor="ffbbbb"
| 127 || August 23 || Orioles || 2–7 || Lopez (6–8) || Mussina (14–7) || — || Yankee Stadium || 54,397 || 78–49
|- bgcolor="bbffbb"
| 128 || August 24 || Orioles || 7–0 || Contreras (4–1) || DuBose (1–4) || — || Yankee Stadium || 47,047 || 79–49
|- bgcolor="bbffbb"
| 129 || August 25 || Orioles || 5–2 || Pettitte (16–7) || Moss (10–9) || Rivera (28) || Yankee Stadium || 50,595 || 80–49
|- bgcolor="ffbbbb"
| 130 || August 26 || White Sox || 2–13 || Loaiza (17–6) || Clemens (12–8) || — || Yankee Stadium || 38,884 || 80–50
|- bgcolor="ffbbbb"
| 131 || August 27 || White Sox || 2–11 || Colon (12–11) || Wells (12–5) || — || Yankee Stadium || 40,654 || 80–51
|- bgcolor="bbffbb"
| 132 || August 28 || White Sox || 7–5 || Mussina (15–7) || Cotts (1–1) || Rivera (29) || Yankee Stadium || 40,569 || 81–51
|- bgcolor="ffbbbb"
| 133 || August 29 || @ Red Sox || 5–10 || Lowe (14–6) || Contreras (4–2) || — || Fenway Park || 34,854 || 81–52
|- bgcolor="bbffbb"
| 134 || August 30 || @ Red Sox || 10–7 || Pettitte (17–7) || Martinez (10–4) || Rivera (30) || Fenway Park || 34,350 || 82–52
|- bgcolor="bbffbb"
| 135 || August 31 || @ Red Sox || 8–4 || Clemens (13–8) || Wakefield (9–6) || Rivera (31) || Fenway Park || 34,482 || 83–52
|-

|- bgcolor="ffbbbb"
| 136 || September 1 || @ Blue Jays || 1–8 || Halladay (18–6) || Wells (12–6) || — || SkyDome || 26,869 || 83–53
|- bgcolor="ffbbbb"
| 137 || September 3 || @ Blue Jays || 3–4 || Kershner (1–3) || Osuna (2–5) || Lopez (8) || SkyDome || 21,770 || 83–54
|- bgcolor="bbffbb"
| 138 || September 4 || @ Blue Jays || 3–2 || Contreras (5–2) || Walker (1–2) || Rivera (32) || SkyDome || 17,254 || 84–54
|- bgcolor="ffbbbb"
| 139 || September 5 || Red Sox || 3–9 || Martinez (11–4) || Pettitte (17–8) || — || Yankee Stadium || 55,261 || 84–55
|- bgcolor="ffbbbb"
| 140 || September 6 || Red Sox || 0–11 || Wakefield (10–6) || Clemens (13–9) || — || Yankee Stadium || 55,237 || 84–56
|- bgcolor="bbffbb"
| 141 || September 7 || Red Sox || 3–1 || Wells (13–6) || Suppan (11–9) || Rivera (33) || Yankee Stadium || 55,212 || 85–56
|- bgcolor="bbffbb"
| 142 || September 8 || Blue Jays || 9–3 || Mussina (16–7) || Escobar (10–9) || — || Yankee Stadium || 8,848 || 86–56
|- bgcolor="bbffbb"
| 143 || September 9 || Tigers || 4–2 || White (4–0) || Rodney (0–3) || Rivera (34) || Yankee Stadium || 31,826 || 87–56
|- bgcolor="bbffbb"
| 144 || September 10 || Tigers || 15–5 || Pettitte (18–8) || Knotts (3–6) || — || Yankee Stadium || 34,000 || 88–56
|- bgcolor="bbffbb"
| 145 || September 11 || Tigers || 5–2 || Clemens (14–9) || Cornejo (6–15) || Rivera (35) || Yankee Stadium || 31,915 || 89–56
|- bgcolor="bbffbb"
| 146 || September 12 || Devil Rays || 10–4 || Wells (14–6) || Zambrano (10–9) || — || Yankee Stadium || 37,401 || 90–56
|- bgcolor="bbffbb"
| 147 || September 13  || Devil Rays || 6–5 || White (5–0) || Kennedy (3–12) || Rivera (36) || Yankee Stadium || 40,887 || 91–56
|- bgcolor="bbffbb"
| 148 || September 13  || Devil Rays || 6–3 || Mussina (17–7) || Reyes (0–3) || Rivera (37) || Yankee Stadium || 19,599 || 92–56
|- bgcolor="ffbbbb"
| 149 || September 14 || Devil Rays || 2–5 || Harper (4–7) || Heredia (5–3) || Carter (24) || Yankee Stadium || 40,861 || 92–57
|- bgcolor="bbffbb"
| 150 || September 15 || @ Orioles || 13–1 || Pettitte (19–8) || Lopez (7–10) || — || Oriole Park at Camden Yards || 27,335 || 93–57
|- bgcolor="bbffbb"
| 151 || September 16 || @ Orioles || 6–3 || Clemens (15–9) || Johnson (10–8) || Rivera (38) || Oriole Park at Camden Yards || 26,263 || 94–57
|- bgcolor="ffbbbb"
| 152 || September 17 || @ Orioles || 3–5 || DuBose (3–5) || Wells (14–7) || Julio (34) || Oriole Park at Camden Yards || 27,108 || 94–58
|- bgcolor="D3D3D3"
| 153 || September 18 || @ Orioles || 1–1  || colspan=3|Game called (rain from Hurricane Isabel) || Oriole Park at Camden Yards || 29,093 || 94–58
|- bgcolor="bbffbb"
| 154 || September 19 || @ Devil Rays || 2–1 || Contreras (6–2) || Waechter (3–1) || Rivera (39) || Tropicana Field || 21,435 || 95–58
|- bgcolor="bbffbb"
| 155 || September 20 || @ Devil Rays || 7–1 || Pettitte (20–8) || Sosa (5–12) || — || Tropicana Field || 27,162 || 96–58
|- bgcolor="bbffbb"
| 156 || September 21 || @ Devil Rays || 6–0 || Clemens (16–9) || Gonzalez (6–10) || — || Tropicana Field || 18,803 || 97–58
|- bgcolor="ffbbbb"
| 157 || September 22 || @ White Sox || 3–6  || Gordon (7–6) || White (5–1) || — || U.S. Cellular Field || 39,627 || 97–59
|- bgcolor="bbffbb"
| 158 || September 23 || @ White Sox || 7–0 || Contreras (7–2) || Buehrle (14–14) || — || U.S. Cellular Field || 31,305 || 98–59
|- bgcolor="ffbbbb"
| 159 || September 24 || @ White Sox || 4–9 || Loaiza (20–9) || Mussina (17–8) || — || U.S. Cellular Field || 26,019 || 98–60
|- bgcolor="bbffbb"
| 160 || September 26  || Orioles || 11–2 || Pettitte (21–8) || Moss (10–12) || — || Yankee Stadium || N/A || 99–60
|- bgcolor="ffbbbb"
| 161 || September 26  || Orioles || 2–3  || Ligtenberg (4–2) || Hammond (3–2) || Julio (36) || Yankee Stadium || 44,983 || 99–61
|- bgcolor="bbffbb"
| 162 || September 27 || Orioles || 6–2 || Clemens (17–9) || Johnson (10–10) || — || Yankee Stadium || 42,702 || 100–61
|- bgcolor="bbffbb"
| 163 || September 28 || Orioles || 3–1 || Wells (15–7) || DuBose (3–6) || Rivera (40) || Yankee Stadium || 42,394 || 101–61
|-

Player stats

Batting

 Starters by position 
Note: Pos = Position; G = Games played; AB = At bats; H = Hits; Avg. = Batting average; HR = Home runs; RBI = Runs batted in

 Other batters 
Note: G = Games played; AB = At bats; H = Hits; Avg. = Batting average; HR = Home runs; RBI = Runs batted in

 Pitching 

 Starting pitchers 
Note: G = Games pitched; GS = Games started; IP = Innings pitched; W = Wins; L = Losses; ERA = Earned run average; SO = Strikeouts

 Other pitchers 
Note: G = Games pitched; IP = Innings pitched; W = Wins; L = Losses; ERA = Earned run average; SO = Strikeouts

 Relief pitchers 
Note: G = Games pitched; W = Wins; L = Losses; SV = Saves; ERA = Earned run average; SO = Strikeouts

Postseason
 Game log 

|- bgcolor="ffbbbb"
| 1 || September 30 || Twins || 1–3 || Hawkins (1–0) || Mussina (0–1) || Guardado (1) || Yankee Stadium || 56,292 || 0–1
|- bgcolor="bbffbb"
| 2 || October 2 || Twins || 4–1 || Pettitte (1–0) || Radke (0–1) || Rivera (1) || Yankee Stadium || 56,479 || 1–1
|- bgcolor="bbffbb"
| 3 || October 4 || @ Twins || 3–1 || Clemens (1–0) || Lohse (0–1) || Rivera (2) || Hubert H. Humphrey Metrodome || 55,915 || 2–1
|- bgcolor="bbffbb"
| 4 || October 5 || @ Twins || 8–1 || Wells (1–0) || Santana (0–1) || — || Hubert H. Humphrey Metrodome || 55,875 || 3–1
|-

|- bgcolor="ffbbbb"
| 1 || October 8 || Red Sox || 2–5 || Wakefield (1–0) || Mussina (0–1) || Williamson (1) || Yankee Stadium || 56,281 || 1–0
|- bgcolor="bbffbb"
| 2 || October 9 || Red Sox || 6–2 || Pettitte (1–0) || Lowe (0–1) || — || Yankee Stadium || 56,295 || 1–1
|- bgcolor="bbffbb"
| 3 || October 11 || @ Red Sox || 4–3 || Clemens (1–0) || Martinez (0–1) || Rivera (1) || Fenway Park || 34,209 || 2–1
|- bgcolor="bbbbbb"
| – || October 12 || @ Red Sox || colspan=8|Postponed (rain) Rescheduled for October 13
|- bgcolor="ffbbbb"
| 4 || October 13 || @ Red Sox || 2–3 || Wakefield (2–0) || Mussina (0–2) || Williamson (2) || Fenway Park || 34,599 || 2–2
|- bgcolor="bbffbb"
| 5 || October 14 || @ Red Sox || 4–2 || Wells (1–0) || Lowe (0–2) || Rivera (2) || Fenway Park || 34,619 || 3–2
|- bgcolor="ffbbbb"
| 6 || October 15 || Red Sox || 6–9 || Embree (1–0) || Contreras (0–1) || Williamson (3) || Yankee Stadium || 56,277 || 3–3
|- bgcolor="bbffbb"
| 7 || October 16 || Red Sox || 6–5  || Rivera (1–0) || Wakefield (2–1) || — || Yankee Stadium || 56,279 || 4–3
|-

|- bgcolor="ffbbbb"
| 1 || October 18 || Marlins || 2–3 || Penny (1–0) || Wells (0–1) || Urbina (1) || Yankee Stadium || 55,769 || 0–1
|- bgcolor="bbffbb"
| 2 || October 19 || Marlins || 6–1 || Pettitte (1–0) || Redman (0–1) || — || Yankee Stadium || 55,750 || 1–1
|- bgcolor="bbffbb"
| 3 || October 21 || @ Marlins || 6–1 || Mussina (1–0) || Beckett (0–1) || Rivera (1) || Pro Player Stadium || 65.731 || 2–1
|- bgcolor="ffbbbb"
| 4 || October 22 || @ Marlins || 3–4  || Looper (1–0) || Weaver (0–1) || — || Pro Player Stadium || 65.934 || 2–2
|- bgcolor="ffbbbb"
| 5 || October 23 || @ Marlins || 4–6 || Penny (2–0) || Contreras (0–1) || Urbina (2) || Pro Player Stadium || 65.975 || 2–3
|- bgcolor="ffbbbb"
| 6 || October 25 || Marlins || 0–2 || Beckett (1–1) || Pettitte (1–1) || — || Yankee Stadium''' || 55,773 || 2–4

Farm system

References

External links
2003 New York Yankees at Baseball Reference
2003 World Series
2003 New York Yankees team page at www.baseball-almanac.com

New York Yankees seasons
New York Yankees
New York Yankees
2000s in the Bronx
American League East champion seasons
American League champion seasons